Prasophyllum spicatum, commonly known as the dense leek orchid, is a species of orchid endemic to southern mainland Australia. It has a single tubular, green leaf and up to fifty brownish and white or greenish and white flowers crowded in a cylinder-shaped spike.

Description
As with others in the genus, the flowers are inverted so that the labellum is above the column rather than below it. The lateral sepals are a similar length to the dorsal sepal but slightly narrower and are free from each other. There is a thin, yellow, channelled callus in the centre of the labellum and extending just past the bend. Flowering occurs from October to December.

Taxonomy and naming
Prasophyllum spicatum was first formally described in 1991 by Robert Bates and David Jones from a specimen collected near Dergholm State Park and the description was published in Australian Orchid Research. The specific epithet (spicatum) is a Latin word meaning "in a spike" referring the dense flower spike of this species.

Distribution and habitat
The dense leek orchid grows in near-coastal heath between Mount Gambier in eastern South Australia and Wilsons Promontory in south-eastern Victoria, although it is absent from the Otway district.

Conservation
Only eight populations of P. spicatum are known, with a total population of about 80 plants. Accurate determination of population size is difficult because of the sometimes dense heath where the orchid grows and its tendency to flower more often after fire. The species is listed as "Vulnerable" under the Commonwealth Government Environment Protection and Biodiversity Conservation Act 1999 (EPBC) Act and the Victorian Flora and Fauna Guarantee Act 1988. It is listed as "Endangered" under the South Australian National Parks and Wildlife Act 1972.

References

External links 
 

spicatum
Flora of South Australia
Flora of Victoria (Australia)
Endemic orchids of Australia
Plants described in 1991